Rudra Pratap Maharathy is an Indian politician from Odisha. He is active with Biju Janata Dal in Odisha politics. He was elected to the Odisha Legislative Assembly in the 2021 Pipili Bypoll as a member of the Biju Janata Dal. He defeated Ashrit Pattanayak of Bharatiya Janata Party in a margin of 20,916 votes.

Early life and family 
Rudra Pratap Maharathy was born to former Indian politician Pradeep Maharathy and Pratibha Mishra.

Political career 
Rudra has joined active politics after the death of his father in 2021. He joined Biju Janata Dal and in 2021 Pipili Byelection, he got 96,972 votes and defeated BJP's Ashrit Pattanayak by a margin of 20,916 votes.

References

External links 

 

Living people
People from Puri district
Biju Janata Dal politicians
Odisha MLAs 2019–2024
1988 births